Moulay Abd al-Rahman bin Hisham, born on 19 February 1778 in Fes and died on 28 August 1859 in Meknes, was a sultan of Morocco from 30 November 1822 to 28 August 1859, as a ruler of the 'Alawi dynasty. He was a son of Moulay Hisham. He was proclaimed sultan in Fes after the death of Moulay Sulayman.

During his long reign he proved himself competent in an age where Africa was being colonized by stronger European nations, such as neighbouring Ottoman Algeria which was invaded by France. He was able to preserve Moroccan independence and maintain Moroccan borders without ceding any land, while also supporting Emir Abd al-Qadir's resistance in Algeria against France. He also signed the necessary treaties to enforce his beliefs, and fought numerous conflicts with European nations, especially France.

Biography
Abd al-Rahman bin Hisham was born in Fes on 19 February 1778. Following the death of his uncle Sulayman, Abd al-Rahman was proclaimed sultan of Morocco in Fes on 30 November 1822. His reign began during a tumultuous time, when many noble families and rural tribal confederations in Morocco were trying to extract greater power away from the center, and spent much of the early part of his reign crushing revolts.  

Abd al-Rahman was tall and tanned, he was firm in his stance despite his advanced age, and wore simple clothes. Every day, he rode a horse to his garden in Agdal, situated near the gates of Fes.  

The will of Moulay Sulayman to entrust the throne to Abd al-Rahman:

Reign

Early reign 
Upon ascension, the sultan's finances were in shambles. With the country in disarray, the central government (the Makhzen) was unable to collect much customary taxation. Abd al-Rahman turned to foreign trade, which had been cut off by the prior sultan, as way to reap in customs revenue, and began to negotiate a series of trade treaties with various European powers.

Abd al-Rahman also decided to revive the institution of Barbary piracy, hoping to replenish his treasury, but this created confrontations with the European powers as British blockaded Tangier in 1828, and the Austrians bombarded Larache, Asilah and Tetouan in 1829. The final bombardment of a Moroccan city in retribution for piracy occurred in 1851 at Salé.

He was an adept leader and administrator and was able to build public works and infrastructure. He did however have to deal with internal conflicts and had to quell revolts many times: 1824–1825, 1828, 1831–1832, 1843, 1849, 1852, 1853, and 1857–1858. He was always successful at placating the nobles and malcontents though.

Conflict with the French

Invasion of Algiers (1830) 

The most serious foreign threat to Morocco, however, was France, which had launched its invasion of neighboring Ottoman Algeria in 1830. The French landing at Sidi Feruj near Algiers and subsequent French victory in the battle of Staouéli caused panic in Morocco, while Moroccans expressed solidarity with the Algerians. In the summer of 1830, Abd al-Rahman accepted boatloads of Algerian refugees arriving in the ports of Tangier and Tetuan, ordering his governors to find them housing and settle them into work.

Occupation of Tlemcen (1830–1831) 
After consulting the ulama of Fes, Abd al-Rahman sent Moroccan troops to defend Tlemcen in 1830, consisting of 5,000 cavalry and two pieces of artillery from Fes, under the son of the sultan, Ali. The troops established their headquarters at Tlemcen, in the province of Oran. The Moroccan troops were warmly welcomed, even in the provinces of Tittery and Constantine, however upon discovering that Turkish and Kouloughli remnants were still fighting among themselves, angered by the stalemate, undisciplined Moroccan soldiers rampaged through the streets of Tlemcen in March 1831, leading to the sultan ordering them to withdraw from the city. Another embassy was sent to Fes, Abd al-Rahman complied with their request and sent an agent to Mascara, the agent was eventually withdrawn. Tlemcen was captured by the French in 1836 after the Battle of Mascara in 1835.

Support for Emir Abd al-Qadir (1832–1844) 

Abd al-Rahman supported the continued guerrilla resistance in Algeria led by Abd al-Qadir al-Jaza'iri who was in theory, a vassal of the Moroccan sultan, albeit only tentatively, not wishing to incur French retaliation. But the border tribes of Morocco continued supporting Abd al-Qadir more actively, prompting the French launch their own strikes over the border and establishing forward outposts in Moroccan territory, which only inflamed the reaction in Morocco and increased the irregular border war. The Moroccan army attacked a French military group which France considered a declaration of war. After learning that the Sultan had sent huge forces to the eastern front, Peugeot gave Morocco a deadline of eight days to withdraw its armies from the east, but the Sultan was not convinced.

Franco-Moroccan War (1844) 

The French then demanded that Morocco cease its support of Abd al-Qadir and cede its eastern frontier lands to French control and, in 1844, launched the First Franco-Moroccan War. The war did not go well for the sultan. The French navy bombarded Mogador (Essaouira) and Tangier, while the Moroccan army, under Abd al-Rahman's son Moulay Muhammad, was defeated by the French at the Battle of Isly in August 1844. Abd al-Rahman consented to the Treaty of Tangier in October 1844, withdrawing support for al-Qadir, and reducing border garrisons.

The treaties aggravated the internal situation in Morocco. Abd al-Rahman in fact rejected the Treaty of Lalla Maghnia at first, blaming it on his negotiators, but was eventually forced to ratify it. Army units and rural tribes across the north and east, already basically ungovernable, started raising rebellions which were only crushed with difficulty. The aftermath saw the break between Abd al-Rahman and Abd al-Qadir.

Bombardment of Salé (1851) 

On 25 November 1851, French ships anchored off Rabat and Salé. Moroccan soldiers in those cities prepared to repel the French attack and armed themselves with artillery. At 10:00 a.m, the French fleet opened fire on the forts of Salé, while the Moroccans retaliated instantly with forty batteries of artillery weapons. An hour later, the batteries in Salé were destroyed, while the artillery in Rabat were damaged to the point where they became almost useless, however Moroccan reinforcements arrived. The damaged batteries were removed from the cities by Moroccan forces who continued to resist. By the end of the bombardment, the Moroccans had 18 to 22 men killed and 47 of them wounded, with many fortifications damaged. On the other hand, the French had losses of 4 killed and 18 wounded, as well as two of their battleships damaged. Both sides claimed victory, as the bombardment ended in a French military victory but also in a Moroccan political victory.

Wadaya revolt (1831–1834) 
As a result of the sultan's withdrawal from Tlemcen in March 1831, the Wadaya rebelled in the countryside of Morocco and recognised a relative of the sultan, Mohammed bin al-Tayyib, as sultan. The revolt began in the north and spread throughout Morocco, including the capital Fes, the sultan decided to leave Fes for Meknes which was safer and was protected by the 'Abid al-Bukhari infantry, but on the way to Meknes he was stopped by rebel troops who sent him back to Fes. After the sultan learned about the unpopularity of the chief minister, he dismissed him, took away his wealth, and gave it to the Wadaya as a generous bribe, but this did not stop the rebellion. A few months later, the sultan managed to escape Fes and settle in Meknes, where he slowly built the army there by recruiting more troops. With this army, he marched on Fes and besieged it for 40 days before the Wadaya surrendered in 1834. The sultan ordered the execution of the two most important leaders of the Wadaya revolt, and dispersed them from Fes to Marrakesh, Larache, and Rabat, ending their rebellion.

Anglo-Moroccan Treaty (1856) 

In 1856, Britain persuaded the sultan to sign a treaty in Tangier on 9 December 1856, after long negotiations between John Hay Drummond Hay, a representative of Queen Victoria, and Muhammad al-Khatib, a representative of the sultan Abd al-Rahman. Moroccan trade was freed from almost all its monopolies, custom duties were reduced to ten percent of value, Morocco's door was opened to a larger volume of overseas trade, and British subjects could own property in Morocco.

Construction 

In 1856, Moulay Abd al-Rahman established the souk of Zraqten on the north side of the High Atlas, adding to territory in southern Morocco controlled by the Glaouis, who were Caids ruling various southern areas from the 18th century until Moroccan independence in 1956, after originally settling in Telouet to establish a souk. They would tax caravans travelling from the Sahara and Tafilalt regions as well as taxing goods sold locally.

The Agdal Gardens of Marrakesh, an irrigated garden, originally established by the Almoravids in the 12th century and enlarged in the days of the Saadians was revamped, reforested and encircled by ramparts during the reign of Moulay Abd al-Rahman.

Armed Forces 

When Moulay Abd al-Rahman bin Hicham ascended the throne on 30 November 1822, Morocco was an undefeated power with a modern army made up of four main armed forces:
 The Guich military tribes or Makhzen tribes which provided the regular contingents.
 The Black Guard or the Abid al-Bukhari who were of Sub-Saharan origin.
 The contingents provided by tribes who paid taxes or provided some contingents of recruits.
 The Holy warriors or the Mujahideen who provided massive levies in case of extreme danger.

Death 

Abd al-Rahman died in Meknes on August 28, 1859, and was buried in the Mausoleum of Moulay Ismail. He was succeeded by his son Muhammad, who took the title of sultan Muhammad IV. Immediately upon Sidi Muhammad's ascension to throne in August 1859, Spain declared war on Morocco, culminating into the Hispano-Moroccan War in which Spain sent troops to Ceuta in order to capture Tetuan.

See also
List of Sultans of Morocco
History of Morocco
'Alawi dynasty
Emir Abdelkader
Battle of Isly

References

Biography

External links 
 Morocco Alawi dynasty
 History of Morocco
 Travel in Morocco
 IterancePlus (English/français)
 Smara, Morocco history (en français)
 Historical Dictionary of Morocco

1778 births
1859 deaths
18th-century Arabs
19th-century Arabs
18th-century Moroccan people
19th-century Moroccan people
19th-century monarchs in Africa
'Alawi dynasty monarchs
'Alawi dynasty
People from Fez, Morocco
People from Marrakesh
People from Meknes